Luchnikovo is a rural locality (a village) in Semyonkovskoye Rural Settlement, Vologodsky District, Vologda Oblast, Russia. The population was 26 as of 2002.

Geography 
Luchnikovo is located 17 km north of Vologda (the district's administrative centre) by road. Obukhovo is the nearest rural locality.

References 

Rural localities in Vologodsky District